Varanus nesterovi, Nesterov’s desert monitor, is a species of lizard of the Varanidae family. It is found on the Iraq-Iran border.

References

Varanus
Reptiles described in 2015
Reptiles of Iraq
Reptiles of Iran